Produce Camp 2020 (Chinese: 创造营2020; pinyin: Chuàngzàoyíng 2020), officially known as CHUANG 2020, is a Chinese girl group reality competition show, which premiered on Tencent Video on May 2, 2020 as the third season of Produce 101 China. It is also the only edition in the series to only have 7 winning contestants, instead of the usual 11. On July 4, 2020, the final seven contestants debuted as BonBon Girls 303 (硬糖少女303).

Background 

The program called for 101 students, letting them grow and improve through missions, training and assessments, under the leadership and guidance of the 4 celebrity coaches and a guest coach. In the end 7 students will debut to form a girl group.

Mentors 

 Huang Zitao
 Luhan
 Victoria Song
 Mao Buyi

Special Mentors 

 Qin Hailu
Kris Wu

Contestants 
Color key

 Top 7 of the week
 Saved from elimination (Reserve trainee)
 Eliminated in Episode 4 (first ranking announcement)
 Eliminated in Episode 5
 Eliminated in Episode 7 (second ranking announcement)
 Eliminated in Episode 9 (third ranking announcement)
 Eliminated in Episode 10 (final ranking announcement)
 Withdrawn from the show
 Final debuting members

Top 7

Result

The finale was held on July 4, 2020, and was broadcast live. The final seven members debuted as 硬糖少女303 (BonBon Girls 303).

Missions

Mission 1: Group Battle 
Color key

 Winning Group
 Center/Leader

Mission 2: Position Battle 
Color key

 Winning Group
 Center/Leader
 Most Voted Trainee 
 Reserve Trainee (旁听者)

Mission 3: Concept Battle 
Color key

 Winning Group
 Center/Leader
 Most Voted Trainee

Mission 4: Final Battle

Discography

Singles

References

Notes

External links

Chinese reality television series
Mandarin-language television shows